Al-Jawadiyah is a town in al-Hasakah Governorate, Syria. According to the Syria Central Bureau of Statistics (CBS), Al-Jawadiyah had a population of 6,630 in the 2004 census. It is the administrative center of a nahiyah ("subdistrict") consisting of 50 localities, with a combined population of 40,535 in 2004.

Demographics
In 2004 the population of the town was 6,630. Kurds and Arabs constitute roughly equal parts of the population.

References

Populated places in al-Malikiyah District
Towns in Syria